Hans Karel Daniël Smits (born January 24, 1956 in Den Helder, North Holland) is a former water polo player from The Netherlands, who won the bronze medal with the Dutch Men's Team at the 1976 Summer Olympics in Montreal, Quebec, Canada.

See also
 List of Olympic medalists in water polo (men)

External links
 

1956 births
Living people
Dutch male water polo players
Olympic bronze medalists for the Netherlands in water polo
Water polo players at the 1976 Summer Olympics
People from Den Helder
Medalists at the 1976 Summer Olympics
20th-century Dutch people
Sportspeople from North Holland